Barnacle Bill may refer to:
 "Barnacle Bill (song)", the theme tune of the BBC children's TV programme Blue Peter  
 William Bernard (sailor), subject of the song
 Barnacle Bill (Martian rock), a 40-cm rock on Mars in Ares Vallis
 Barnacle Bill (1930 film), a Fleischer Studios animated short film
 Barnacle Bill (1935 film), a film starring Archie Pitt and Joan Gardner
 Barnacle Bill (1941 film), a film starring Wallace Beery and Marjorie Main
 Barnacle Bill (1957 film), an Ealing Studios comedy film starring Alec Guinness
 Barnacle Bill, Popeye's rival for Olive Oyl in the 1935 animated cartoon Beware of Barnacle Bill
 Barnacle Bill and the Seven Seas, a fictional musical group in the animated series SpongeBob SquarePants
 "Barnacle Bill the Sailor", an American drinking song